Gérard Arseguel (1938 – 29 February 2020) was a French poet.

Works
Décharges (1979)
Une méthode de discours sur la lumière (1979)
Les Bleus du procédé (1981)
Messes basses pour Mousba (1982)
L’Arrivée sur le littoral (1984)
Les Malheurs de Sophie (1984)
Ce que parler veut dire (1987)
Portrait du cœur sous les nuages (1988)
À feu doux : House poetry (1990)
Suivie du bleu (1993)
Bruit d’ailes (1995)
Heures d'hiver (1997)
Théorie de l’envol (1996)
Ça s’est passé en Haute-Provence (1997)
Esthétique de l’abandon (2001)
Le Journal du bord de terre : déclinaison (2003)
L’Almanach des montagnes (2006)
Âme, de quel divin ! (2008)
Messes basses pour Mousba (2012)
Autobiographie du bras gauche (2017)
Le petit bois qu'aimait Gérard (2017)
La Sainte (2019)
Le Campanile de Sambuco (2019)

References

1938 births
2020 deaths
French male poets